The Directorate for Enemy Property was a Norwegian government agency responsible for nationalization of all enemy property in Norway following the end of World War II. The organization was established on 8 March 1945 and disestablished on 31 December 1956. It had its head office in Oslo and was subordinate to the Ministry of Trade and Industry.

References

Defunct government agencies of Norway
Organisations based in Oslo
Government agencies established in 1945
Government agencies disestablished in 1956
1945 establishments in Norway